The Simón Planas Municipality is one of the nine municipalities (municipios) that makes up the Venezuelan state of Lara and, according to a 2007 population estimate by the National Institute of Statistics of Venezuela, the municipality has a population of 35,170.  The town of Sarare is the shire town of the Simón Planas Municipality.

History
The municipality was officially founded in 1990.

Demographics
The Simón Planas Municipality, according to a 2011 population census by the National Institute of Statistics of Venezuela, has a population of 35,802 (up from 29,521 in 2000). This amounts to 2% of the state's population.

Government
The mayor of the Simón Planas Municipality is Naudy Jesús Ledezma Canelón, re-elected on October 31, 2004, with 61% of the vote.  The municipality is divided into three parishes; Sarare, Buría, and Gustavo Vegas León.

See also
Sarare
Lara
Municipalities of Venezuela

References

External links
simonplanas-lara.gob.ve 

Municipalities of Lara (state)